Telepathist may refer to:
Telepathy
The Whole Man, novel by John Brunner